Arthur Everett "Pappy" Lewis (February 9, 1911 – June 13, 1962) was an American football player and coach.  He played college football as a lineman at Ohio University from 1932 to 1935 and then in the National Football League (NFL) being a first-round draft choice by the New York Giants in 1936 and the Cleveland Rams from 1938 to 1939.  Lewis also served as the interim head coach for the Rams for the last eight games of the 1938 season becoming the youngest head coach in NFL history. He was the head football coach at Washington and Lee University from 1946 to 1948 and at West Virginia University from 1950 to 1959, compiling a career college football record of 69–55–2.  At West Virginia, Lewis led the Mountaineers to five Southern Conference titles and an appearance in the 1954 Sugar Bowl.

Early life and college career
Born February 18, 1911, in Pomeroy, Ohio, Lewis was a standout tackle at Middleport High School in Middleport, Ohio.  At the age of 21, he enrolled at Ohio University, where he played tackle from 1932 to 1935 and earned All-American honors his senior year.  He capped off his college football career appearing in the 1935 East-West Shrine Game.  It was in college that he got his nickname "Pappy".

Professional career
Lewis was drafted by the New York Giants in the first round (ninth overall) of the 1936 NFL Draft.  After playing one year, Lewis left to coach at Ohio Wesleyan University but left a year later to join the Cleveland Rams as an assistant coach/player.  He became the interim head coach mid season.  This made him the youngest head coach in NFL history at the age of 27.  He coached the team to a 4–4 record and stayed with the team as a player for the 1939 season.

Collegiate coaching

After serving in the United States Navy during World War II, Lewis became the head coach of Washington and Lee University. Here he found his talent as a recruiter but his overall record was 11–17.  He coached one year as an assistant at Mississippi State University and then was appointed the head coach at West Virginia University.  His first couple seasons were rather lackluster but the team turned around during the 1952 season going 7–2 and finishing second in conference play.  The 1953 season was his greatest season at West Virginia.  The team went 8–1 in the regular season, captured the Southern Conference title and started a three-year winning streak against arch-rival Penn State.  The tenth ranked Mountaineers then journeyed to the Sugar Bowl to face eighth ranked Georgia Tech where they lost 42–19.  Under Lewis, the Mountaineers continued to dominate the Southern Conference winning the conference title four more times.  Much of his success as a coach was credited to his recruiting abilities. He was able to attract such players as Sam Huff, Chuck Howley, Joe Marconi and others.  The 1958 and 1959 seasons saw a major drop off and Lewis resigned as head coach.

Later life
After leaving West Virginia, Lewis accepted a position with the Pittsburgh Steelers as a talent scout and stayed with them until his death. Lewis died of a heart attack on June 13, 1962, at the age of 51. He is considered one of the greatest coaches in West Virginia history and was inducted into the West Virginia Sports Hall of Fame in 1966. He has ten great grandchildren, Caroline, Grace, and young Michael, Drew, Taylor, Sydney, Rissa, Molly, Casey and Tessa.

Head coaching record

NFL

College

References

External links

 
 

1911 births
1962 deaths
American football guards
American football tackles
Cleveland Rams players
New York Giants players
People from Middleport, Ohio
Mississippi State Bulldogs football coaches
Ohio Bobcats football players
Ohio Wesleyan Battling Bishops football coaches
West Virginia Mountaineers football coaches
Washington and Lee Generals football coaches
United States Navy personnel of World War II
People from Pomeroy, Ohio
Players of American football from Ohio
Cleveland Rams head coaches